Brotia pagodula is a species of freshwater snail with an operculum, an aquatic gastropod mollusk in the family Pachychilidae.

Taxonomy 
Brotia pagodula is the type species of the genus Brotia.

There is evidence from analysis of mtDNA that this species may actually be two distinct species living in the same area.

Distribution 

This species occurs in:
 Myanmar
 Thailand

Human use
It is a part of ornamental pet trade for freshwater aquaria. Common names for the species include the porcupine snail, the pagoda snail, and the horned armour snail.

References

External links 
 

pagodula
Gastropods described in 1847